Italy competed at the 1981 Summer Universiade in Bucharest, Romania and won 13 medals.

Medals

Details

References

External links
 Universiade (World University Games)
 WORLD STUDENT GAMES (UNIVERSIADE - MEN)
 WORLD STUDENT GAMES (UNIVERSIADE - WOMEN)

1981
Italy
Summer U